Chotylub  (Khotyliub) is a village in the administrative district of Gmina Cieszanów, within Lubaczów County, Subcarpathian Voivodeship, in south-eastern Poland.

The village has a population of 530.

References

Villages in Lubaczów County